The Scottish Historical Review is a biannual academic journal in the field of Scottish historical studies, covering Scottish history from the early to the modern, encouraging a variety of historical approaches. It superseded The Scottish Antiquary, Or, Northern Notes & Queries.

In addition to its book reviews, the Scottish Historical Review also includes lists of articles in Scottish history and essays on Scottish history in books published in the preceding year. It is published twice yearly, in April and October by Edinburgh University Press for the Scottish Historical Review Trust.

See also
 Historiography of Scotland

External links 
 
 The Scottish Historical Review at Project MUSE

Historiography of Scotland
British history journals
Magazines published in Scotland
Biannual journals
Edinburgh University Press academic journals
Publications established in 1921
1921 establishments in Scotland